The University of Da Nang is a regional multi-disciplinary university in Central Vietnam.

Organizational structure
The University of Da Nang was established on April 4, 1994, upon the rearrangement and reorganization of the former institutes:
Polytechnic University
Da Nang Foreign Language Teachers Training College
Quang Nam Teachers Training College
Nguyen Van Troi Vocational School

In line with Hue University and Thai Nguyen University, the University of Da Nang is one of three regional universities in Vietnam which have a wide variety of training levels.

As of 2020, the University of Da Nang consisted of:
 Six member universities:
University of Science and Technology (DUT)
Vietnam-Korea University of Information and Communication Technology (VKU)
University of Technology and Education (UTE)
University of Education (UED)
University of Economics (DUE)
University of Foreign Language Studies (UFLS)

 Three member schools:

 School of Medicine and Pharmacy  (SMP)
 School of International Education
 School of Physical Education

 Two research institutes:
VNUK Institute of Research and Executive education (VNUK)
Danang International Institute of Technology

 One campus:

 UD’s Campus in Kon Tum
 Ten centers for training and upgrading, scientific research promotion and technology transfer
 Journal of Science and Technology
 Maker Innovation Space

Development orientation
The University of Da Nang will continue to consolidate the assets such as laboratories, workshops, libraries; expand the scope and training majors with focus on high technologies, renovating the training curricula, improving teaching methodologies, increasing the quality of training, applying scientific research results to practice to meet the renovation of national economy.

The Prime Minister has approved the master plan for the University of Da Nang, including an area of 300 hectares at Hoa Quy-Dien Ngoc, 15 km from Đà Nẵng City center to the south-east. The preparation work for the construction site and the infrastructure have begun.

Notes and references

External links
The University of Da Nang
Danang University of Technology
Danang University of Economics
Danang University of Education
Danang University of Foreign Language Studies
Danang College of Technology
The Danang College of Information Technology
The Danang Faculty of Medicine and phamarcy
The Campus in Kontum
VNUK Institute of Research and Executive Education

Universities in Da Nang